Barrets Green is a small settlement in the unitary authority of Cheshire East and the ceremonial county of Cheshire, England. Local farms include Barrets Green Farm and The Grange. For administrative purposes, Barrets Green falls mainly within the civil parish of Alpraham, with a small part in Calveley; it is approximately  miles from each of these two villages.

As of 2016, Barrets Green is served by the Arriva North West Chester–Crewe bus route 84, with a stop near the Long Lane junction on the A51.

References

Villages in Cheshire